USS Eclipse (SP-417) was a United States Navy patrol vessel in commission from 1917 to 1919.
 
Eclipse was built as a private motor schooner of the same name in 1906 by Bishops at Gloucester, Massachusetts. On 31 August 1917, the U.S. Navy acquired her under a free lease from her owner, Frank W. Spencer of Savannah, Georgia, for use as a section patrol vessel during World War I. She was commissioned the same day as USS Eclipse (SP-417).

Assigned to the 6th Naval District, Eclipse was based at Savannah, where she served as a pilot boat and guard ship for the remainder of World War I.

Eclipse was returned to her owner on 6 January 1919 after the close of the First World War.

References

Department of the Navy Naval History and Heritage Command Online Library of Selected Images: Civilian Ships: Eclipse (American Auxiliary Schooner, 1906). Was USS Eclipse (SP-417) in 1917-1919
NavSource Online: Section Patrol Craft Photo Archive: Eclipse (SP 417)

Patrol vessels of the United States Navy
World War I patrol vessels of the United States
Ships built in Gloucester, Massachusetts
1906 ships
Schooners of the United States Navy